Jürgen Zopp was the defending champion but chose not to compete.

In the final, Oleksandr Nedovyesov defeated Andrey Golubev 6–4, 6–1.

Seeds

Draw

Finals

Top half

Bottom half

References
 Main Draw
 Qualifying Draw

2013 ATP Challenger Tour
2013 Singles
2013 in Russian tennis